Joseph H. Crawford Jr. (born 1932) is an American science fiction collector and bibliographer. He notably compiled 333: A Bibliography of the Science-Fantasy Novel with James J. Donahue and Donald M. Grant which was published by The Grandon Company in 1953.  Crawford was born in Providence, Rhode Island in 1932. He graduated from La Salle Academy in 1949 and received a B. A. in Political Science from Providence College in 1953. He served in the United States Army from 1955-1957. Crawford was first attracted to science fiction through the magazine Famous Fantastic Mysteries.

References

1932 births
Living people
American bibliographers
La Salle Academy alumni
Providence College alumni
United States Army personnel